The Alfred Friendly Foundation is an American nonprofit foundation that awards Alfred Friendly Press Fellowships to journalists from nations in the developing world. The program is offered annually to approximately ten professional print journalists between the ages of 25 and 35, giving them a six-month, in-depth, practical introduction to the professional and ethical standards of the U.S. print media.

The fellowships were created in 1984 by Alfred Friendly, a Pulitzer Prize-winning reporter and former managing editor of the Washington Post. Convinced that healthy democracies need strong, free media, Friendly conceived a fellowship program that would both impart American journalistic traditions and respond to worldwide interest in the dissemination of fair and accurate news.

The Daniel Pearl Foundation joined with AFPF in 2003 to offer special fellowships to honor the life and work of journalist Daniel Pearl. Daniel Pearl Fellows have been placed with the Washington, D.C. bureau of the Wall Street Journal, Los Angeles Times, the Berkshire Eagle and North Adams Transcript.

Advisory committee
Stephen Buckley
Kenneth F. Bunting
Milton Coleman
Jonathan Friendly 
Nicholas Friendly
Lucinda F. Murphy
David Nalle
John M. Sirek
Ellen Soeteber
Randall Smith
Susan Talalay
Howard A. Tyner
Peter S. Young

See also

 Alfred Friendly

References

External links
AFPF Webpage

Organizations established in 1984
Foundations based in the United States
American journalism organizations
International journalism organizations
1984 establishments in the United States